Tropical Storm Podul, known in the Philippines as Tropical Depression Zoraida, was a weak but destructive tropical cyclone that affected the Philippines shortly after the devastating Typhoon Haiyan. The 31st named storm of the 2013 Pacific typhoon season, Podul developed as a tropical depression on November 11 between Palau and the Philippine island of Mindanao. The system moved west-northwestward and struck Davao Oriental in Mindanao on November 12, bringing heavy rainfall that killed two people and disrupted relief efforts following Haiyan. After crossing the Philippines, the depression intensified into Tropical Storm Podul on November 14. Shortly thereafter, the storm struck southeastern Vietnam, and its circulation dissipated on November 15. In Vietnam, Podul produced heavy rainfall that resulted in severe flooding. The storm damaged or destroyed 427,258 houses, and overall damage was estimated at 4.1 trillion₫ (2013 Vietnamese đồng, $194.1 million 2013 USD). Podul killed 44 people in the country and caused 66 injuries.

Meteorological history

The system consisted of a broad circulation, affected to its detriment by moderate wind shear. Moving west-northwestward, the convection persisted and organized into the circulation, indicative of an increased potential for tropical cyclogenesis. Late on November 10, the Joint Typhoon Warning Center (JTWC) issued a Tropical Cyclone Formation Alert (TCFA), meaning the agency anticipated a tropical depression would develop within 24 hours. Shortly thereafter, the Philippine Atmospheric, Geophysical and Astronomical Services Administration (PAGASA) initiated advisories on Tropical Depression Zoraida after the system entered its area of responsibility of the agency. At 1200 UTC on November 11, the Japan Meteorological Agency (JMA) estimated that a tropical depression formed about halfway between Palau and the Philippine island of Mindanao, although operationally the agency had classified the system two days prior.

After passing south of Palau, the system's circulation became more broad and its convection became less organized, despite decreased wind shear. Early on November 12, the depression made landfall on Mindanao in Davao Oriental province. Shortly thereafter, PAGASA discontinued advisories on Zoraida, declaring that the depression degenerated into a low pressure area. By contrast, the JMA continued monitoring the depression as it moved through the Philippines and into the Sulu Sea. On November 13, the center crossed over Palawan island into the South China Sea. Around the same time, the JTWC began issuing warnings on the system as a tropical depression 32W, noting that convection had rapidly increased over the circulation. The agency also mentioned the continued presence of wind shear, although warm water temperatures and moderate outflow were expected to allow intensification.

Late on November 14, Podul made landfall in southeastern Vietnam near Phan Rang–Tháp Chàm and quickly weakened into a tropical depression. The JTWC assessed the circulation was dissipating near the coast, and the JMA declared Podul dissipated at 1200 UTC on November 15. Operationally, the agency tracked the system into the Gulf of Thailand, and the Thai Meteorological Department tracked Podul to near the Malay Peninsula on November 16, before ceasing advisories on the storm. The remnants later redeveloped into Severe Cyclonic Storm Helen in the Bay of Bengal, which later struck southeastern India on November 22 before dissipating.

Preparations and impact

The Guam National Weather Service warned of the potential of heavy rainfall and high surf for Palau and nearby Yap island.

Over the next day these warnings were extended to cover three provinces in Luzon, eight provinces in Visayas and twenty-one provinces in Mindanao. On Cebu Island, officials ordered schools to close during the storm's passage. After the extreme damage due to Typhoon Haiyan in the Philippines, the depression that became Podul affected the same areas just days later, which affected rescue work. The depression caused additional difficulties in travel and communications. In addition to causing a landslide in Monkayo, flooding from the depression covered roads and forced about 1,000 families to evacuate. In Davao del Norte, the depression resulted in river flooding that killed two people.

High volumes of flooding caused water to be released from reservoirs, which some local officials credited for the widespread flooding. About  of canals and dykes were washed away during the storm. The high rainfall increased water levels along rivers, with the Ba River in Gia Lai Province reaching  higher than the record set in 1981. The storm damaged or destroyed 427,258 houses, and overall damage was estimated at 4.1 trillion₫ (2013 Vietnamese đồng, $194.12 million 2013 USD). Throughout Vietnam, Podul killed 44 people and injured 74 others. By November 20, the floods began receding from most locations. Newspapers described the flooding as the worst in Vietnam since 1999. After the storm, the Vietnamese provincial governments assisted in rebuilding houses and roads.

See also

Typhoon Hester (1971) – typhoon that moved across southern Philippines and later struck Vietnam
Tropical Storm Kim (1983)
1999 Vietnamese floods

Notes

References

External links

JMA General Information of Tropical Storm Podul (1331) from Digital Typhoon
JMA Best Track Data of Tropical Storm Podul (1331) 
JMA Best Track Data (Graphics) of Tropical Storm Podul (1331)
JMA Best Track Data (Text)
JTWC Best Track Data of Tropical Depression 32W (Podul)
32W.PODUL from the U.S. Naval Research Laboratory

2013 Pacific typhoon season
2013 disasters in the Philippines
Typhoons in the Philippines
Typhoons in Vietnam
2013 in Vietnam
Western Pacific tropical storms
Podul